Monastery of St. Jerome may refer to:

in Portugal
Monastery of St Jerome, Lisbon

in Spain
Monastery of Saint Jerome (Granada)

See also
 St. Jerome Church (disambiguation)